In music, Op. 146 stands for Opus number 146. Compositions that are assigned this number include:

 Reger – Clarinet Quintet
 Schumann – Romanzen und Balladen, Vol. V
 Strauss – Novellen